Shahzad Nawaz is a Pakistani film director, actor, singer, advertiser and graphic designer. He started his career as an advisor to many news agencies and media publications, and served as a CEO of Nai Baat Media Network for a year. He also worked as a graphic designer for a number organization's designing their logos including Pakistan Television Corporation.

In 2003 and 2005 he directed and acted in two film Daira and Botal Gali, based on an adaptations of Mohsin Hamid book Moth Smoke, and acted in Geo's drama series Ana (2004). Nawaz was noted in the film Chambaili that he wrote and produced. It was the first political film of country, earning him critical appraisal and a nomination ARY Film Award for Best Film as producer. In 2016, he marked his Coke Studio debut as a featured artist in season 9.

Career

Film
In 2014, he briefly served as a CEO of  Nai Baat Media Network. During his advisor tenure he also designed number of TV networks and organizations logos and helped them build a strong market relation including Dunya,  Geo, Ary and Nai Baat Media Network.

Nawaz ventures int directing with films such as Daira and Botal Gali based on the book Moth Smoke by Mohsin Hamid. He then acted and drama serials Ana (2004) and Ishq Mein Teray (2013). In 2011, Nawaz working on his script with director Ismail Jilani and it took half and year to complete the screenplay process, in 2012 production began and film released on April 26, 2013 under the banner of Geo Films. Jilani stated that "We wanted to mobilize the people before the elections, We wanted them to come out of the cinema and feel like they wanted to change something". Chambailli grossed Rs 37.8 crore at the box office. At its release, the film surpassed Bollywood's Aashiqui 2 and Hollywood's Oblivion at the Pakistani box office. It was discussed in the national media, and has been praised for its contribution to democracy in Pakistan. Chambaili has been credited with galvanizing non-voters and youth to vote in the 2013 Pakistani general elections, which had a large turnout. Political parties in the country played songs from its soundtrack during campaign rallies, as young people resonated with the film and its music as part of increased social and political activism. In 2016, he directed a film RAW in association with Coup D'état Films and Neo Films.

In 2016, he marked his Coke Studio debut as a featured artist in season 9. Nawaz has recorded only a narration with singers Javed Bashir and Masoma Anwar, and has expresses to sing in next season.

Politics
He joined Pak Sarzameen Party in 2016 and did a press conference with Syed Mustafa Kamal. He shocked the media by joining PSP.

Filmography

Film
 Daira as actor (2003) 
 Botal Gali (2005) 
 Chambaili as writer-producer (2013)
 RAW (2016)

Television
 Ana (2004)
 Ishq Mein Teray as Sheheryar Hamdani (2013-2015)
 Coke Studio: Season 9 (2016)
 Qarar (2020)
 Parizaad (2021)
 Badshah Begum (2022)

Awards and nominations
 2013: ARY Film Award for Best Film - Chambaili (nom).

References

External links 
 

Living people
People from Karachi
People from Lahore
Pakistani male film actors
Pakistani male television actors
Pakistani filmmakers
Pakistani screenwriters
Pakistani producers
Pakistani film directors
Pakistani male singers
Pakistani graphic designers
Pakistani songwriters
Pakistani rock musicians
Musicians from Karachi
Pakistani pop singers
Pakistani classical singers
Year of birth missing (living people)